The Florida Women's Hall of Fame is an honor roll of women who have contributed to life for citizens of the US state of Florida. An awards ceremony for the hall of fame was first held in 1982 and recipient names are displayed in the Florida State Capitol. The program was created by an act of the Florida Legislature and is overseen by the Florida Commission on the Status of Women (FCSW), a nonpartisan board created in 1991 to study and "make recommendations to the Governor, Cabinet and Legislature on issues affecting women". The FCSW also manages the Florida Achievement Award for those who have improved the lives of women and girls in Florida, an award is focused on outstanding volunteerism. FCSW members serve by appointment and the commission is housed at the Office of the Attorney General of Florida.

History
President John F. Kennedy created the Presidential Commission on the Status of Women (PCSW) in 1961, and in 1964 Florida Governor Farris Bryant created the Governor's Commission on the Status of Women (COSW) "to study laws and regulations pertaining to women in Florida and make recommendations to the legislature based on their findings."
In 1992, Governor Lawton Chiles proposed, and the Legislature passed a bill (CSSB 1148) that created a permanent Florida Women's Hall of Fame. Chapter 92-48 of the Laws of Florida now states: "It is the intent of the Legislature to recognize and honor those women who, through their works and lives, have made significant improvement of the life for women and for citizens of Florida."

This legislation mandated the inclusion of women who had been honored in the previous decade. Because education is one important purpose of the Hall of Fame, CSSB 1148 provided display space in the Florida Capitol. In 1994, the Commission unveiled plaques that offer a brief biography and photograph of each honoree.

Florida Statutes, Title XVIII Public Lands and Property, Chapter 265 Memorials, Museums and Arts and Culture, section 265.001 Florida Women's Hall of Fame, sets the parameters within which the hall of fame operates. In 1982, the first Florida Women's Hall of Fame ceremony and reception was held by COSW at the Florida Governor's Mansion in Tallahassee.

Overview
The purpose of the Florida Women's Hall of Fame, according to the intention expressed in the actual Florida Statute, is "to recognize and honor those women who, through their works and lives, have made significant contributions to the improvement of life for women and for all citizens of Florida".

Each year, women from Florida, or who have adopted it as their home state, are nominated for induction. The governor of Florida decides on the final three nominees from a shortlist of ten nominees. The rotunda of the Florida State Capitol building has a permanent display of photos of Florida Women's Hall of Fame inductees.

Since 1992, up to three women have been inducted into the Hall each year. Nominations are made between April 1 and July 15 of each year. These nominations are carefully reviewed by members of the FCSW who then propose 10 finalists to the Governor who selects the final inductees each year.

Several other states have a Hall of Fame for notable women, including Alabama, Arizona, Colorado, Connecticut, Iowa, Maine, Michigan, Maryland, Ohio and Texas. The United States' National Women's Hall of Fame is based in Seneca Falls, New York.

Inductees

References

Additional sources

Further reading

External links
 Official website

Women's halls of fame
Lists of American women
Halls of fame in Florida
1982 establishments in Florida
Awards established in 1982
Women in Florida
Lists of people from Florida